Pope parish is an administrative unit of the Ventspils Municipality, Latvia.The parish has a population of 1126 (as of 1/07/2010) and covers an area of 167.745 km2.

Pope Wind Farm, currently largest wind farm in Latvia, is located in the parish.

Villages of Pope parish 
 Jaunāmuiža
 Pope
 Topciems
 Vēde

See also 
 Pope Palace

Parishes of Latvia
Ventspils Municipality